George Ernest Gibson (November 9, 1884 – August 26, 1959) was a Scottish-born American nuclear chemist.

Early years
George Ernest Gibson was born in Edinburgh, Scotland and educated partly in Germany where he attended a gymnasium in Darmstadt, finishing his schooling in Edinburgh. He studied chemistry at the University of Edinburgh receiving his B.Sc. in 1906. He worked with Otto Lummer at the former University of Breslau (now University of Wrocław) where he received his Ph.D. in 1911, and stayed there as lecturer for two additional years before returning to the University of Edinburgh in 1912.

Work

In 1913 he became professor at the University of California, Berkeley. Two of his students were awarded a Nobel Prize in Chemistry, William Giauque and Glenn T. Seaborg. In 1927 he stayed a year with Walter Heitler in Göttingen as a Guggenheim Fellow. He retired in 1954 and died in 1959.

Honors
He was elected in 1923 a Fellow of the American Physical Society.

References

 biography form the Online Archive of California

1884 births
1959 deaths
20th-century American chemists
Alumni of the University of Edinburgh
University of California, Berkeley faculty
Fellows of the American Physical Society
British emigrants to the United States